The Dahlia Handicap was a race for thoroughbred horses run annually at Hollywood Park Racetrack in Inglewood, California. The Dahlia is open to fillies and mares, age three and up, willing to race one and one-sixteenth miles on the turf.  A Grade II was last run 2008.

The race was run in two divisions in 1982, 1983, 1987, 1989, and 1990. It is named in honor of the National Museum of Racing and Hall of Fame inductee, the great racing mare Dahlia.  Born in 1970, died in 2001 at age of 31, Dahlia won the big races in France, in England, in the United States, and in Canada.

Due to problems with the turf course, in 2004 the race was run on dirt and as such for that event was downgraded to a G-III event.

Records
Speed record:
 1:40.40 - Stylish Star (1989)
 1:40.40 - Saros Brig (1989)

Most wins:
 No horse has won this race more than once.

Most wins by a trainer:
 7 - Robert J. Frankel

Winners since 1999

Earlier winners

 1998 - Tuzla
 1997 - Golden Arches
 1996 - Sixieme Sens
 1995 - Fidina
 1994 - Skimble
 1993 - Kalita Melody
 1992 - Kostroma
 1991 - Re Toss
 1990 - Petalia
 1990 - Little Brianne
 1989 - Stylish Star
 1989 - Saros Brig
 1988 - Balbonella
 1987 - Top Corsage
 1987 - Invited Guest
 1986 - Aberuschka
 1985 - Capricorn Belle
 1984 - Lina Cavalieri
 1983 - Geraldines Store
 1983 - First Advance
 1982 - Sangue
 1982 - Milingo

References
 The Dahlia Handicap at Pedigree Query
 Hollywood Park official website

Horse races in California
Hollywood Park Racetrack
Graded stakes races in the United States
Mile category horse races for fillies and mares
Turf races in the United States
Recurring sporting events established in 1982
1982 establishments in California
Discontinued horse races
Recurring sporting events disestablished in 2008